Florence J. was a small gasoline-powered vessel built in 1913 or 1914 at Dockton, Washington.  The vessel is chiefly remembered for having capsized immediately upon being launched.

Career
Florence J. was built to replace the Rene,  then owned by Union Oil Service and running on Puget Sound. The vessel was equipped with an  Frisco Standard gasoline engine. Florence J. is also reported to have been launched in 1914.

Launching
Florence J. is chiefly known for the major failure that accompanied the launching of the vessel, which was recorded by the important Puget Sound maritime photographer Asahel Curtis.

Name change
In 1920 the vessel's name is recorded as having been changed to Despatch No. 5.

Notes

References 
 Newell, Gordon R., ed., H.W. McCurdy Marine History of the Pacific Northwest,  Superior Publishing (1966)
  U.S. Dept. of the Treasury, Bureau of the Statistics, Annual list of Merchant Vessels of the United States  (for the year ending 1913)
  Department of Commerce, Bureau of Navigation, Seagoing Vessels of the United States (1920).

Steamboats of Washington (state)
Maritime incidents in 1913
Maritime incidents in 1914
Shipwrecks of the Washington coast
1913 ships
1914 ships
Ships built in Dockton, Washington